Armoured Carrier, Wheeled, Indian Pattern (ACV-IP), known also as Indian Pattern Carrier or other similar names, was an armoured car produced in India during the Second World War. It was typically armed with a Bren light machine gun. Those produced by Tata Locomotives were called "Tatanagars" after the location of the works. 4,655 were produced, used by Indian units in the Far East and Mediterranean and Middle East Theatre, typically in divisional reconnaissance regiments.

History
At the outbreak of the Second World War, the United Kingdom was unable to meet the needs of the Commonwealth for armoured fighting vehicles. It led many Commonwealth countries to develop their own vehicles. As production of heavy armoured vehicles, such as tanks, required advanced industry which those countries lacked, most of the developed fighting vehicles were armoured cars, often based on imported chassis.

In India a series of armoured vehicles was developed, known as Armoured Carrier, Wheeled, Indian Pattern or ACV-IP. These vehicles used Ford or GMC CMP truck chassis imported from Canada. Armoured hulls were constructed mainly by the Indian Railways. The armament typically consisted of Bren light machine gun, in some variants mounted in a small turret and Boys anti-tank rifle. The No. 19 radio set was carried. The vehicle was in production from 1940 until 1944, 4,655 being built.

The ACV-IP was used by Indian units in the Far East and Mediterranean and Middle East Theatre, typically in divisional reconnaissance regiments, as reconnaissance vehicle, personnel carrier, AA weapons carrier or Forward Observation Officer vehicle.

Variants

 Mk I — initial version, based on Ford model 1940 truck chassis with motor in front, fitted with a Marmon-Herrington all wheel drive kit.
 Mk II — Ford CO11QRF chassis (all wheel drive, motor in the rear, right hand drive).
 Mk IIA — modified armoured hull.
 Mk IIB — thicker armour.
 Mk IIC — Ford C191QRF chassis, armoured roof and small turret for Bren MG.
 Mk III — similar to Mk IIC, with slightly modified hull. 276 units built.
 Mk IV — Ford C291QR chassis, open hull.

Notes

References
 George Forty - World War Two Armoured Fighting Vehicles and Self-Propelled Artillery, Osprey Publishing 1996, .
 I. Moschanskiy - Armored vehicles of the Great Britain 1939-1945 part 2, Modelist-Konstruktor, Bronekollektsiya 1999-02 (И. Мощанский - Бронетанковая техника Великобритании 1939-1945 часть 2, Моделист-Конструктор, Бронеколлекция 1999–02).

External links

 ACV-IP at Flames of War
 Indian Armor at TANKS!
 ACV-IP at Wargaming.net
 ACV-IP at ww2drawings.jexiste.fr

Military history of India during World War II
World War II armoured cars
Military vehicles of India
Military vehicles introduced from 1940 to 1944